This is a list of Canadian television related events from 2000.

Events

Debuts

Ending this year

Changes of network affiliation

Television shows

1950s 
Country Canada (1954–2007)
Hockey Night in Canada (1952–present)
The National (1954–present).

1960s 
CTV National News (1961–present)
Land and Sea (1964–present)
The Nature of Things (1960–present, scientific documentary series)
Question Period (1967–present, news program)
W-FIVE (1966–present, newsmagazine program)

1970s 
Canada AM (1972–2016, news program)
the fifth estate (1975–present, newsmagazine program)
Marketplace (1972–present, newsmagazine program)
100 Huntley Street (1977–present, religious program)

1980s 
CityLine (1987–present, news program)
Fashion File (1989–2009)
Just For Laughs (1988–present)
On the Road Again (1987–2007)
Venture (1985–2007)

1990s 
 CBC News Morning (1999–present)
 BeastMaster (1999–2002)
 Bob and Margaret (1998–2001)
 Cold Squad (1998–2005)
 Da Vinci's Inquest (1998–2005)
 Daily Planet (1995–present)
 eTalk (1995–present, entertainment newsmagazine program
 La Femme Nikita (1997–2001)
 Life and Times (1996–2007)
 Made in Canada (1998–2003)
 Mona the Vampire (1999–2006, children's animated series)
 The Passionate Eye (1993–present)
 Royal Canadian Air Farce (1993–2008)
 The Red Green Show (1991–2006)
 This Hour Has 22 Minutes (1993–present)
 Turtle Island (1999–2000)
 Witness (1992–2004)
 Yvon of the Yukon (1999–2005, children's animated series)

TV movies

Television stations

Debuts

References

See also 
 2000 in Canada
 List of Canadian films of 2000